Hussein Faris (18 September 1935 – 28 April 2021) was an Israeli Arab politician who served as a member of the Knesset for Mapam and Meretz between 1988 and 1992.

Biography
Born in Sha'ab during the Mandate era, Faris attended high school in Kafr Yasif, before studying Middle Eastern studies and Arabic literature at the University of Haifa, earning a BA. During his youth he was a member of the Arab Pioneers movement and a member of the board of Hashomer Hatzair.

He went on to join Mapam, and became chief editor of the party's Arabic journal. In 1988 he was elected to the Knesset on the party's list, and became a member of the Education and Culture Committee and the Committee for the Appointment of Qadis. He lost his seat in the 1992 elections shortly after Mapam merged into Meretz.

Faris was also a member of the board of the Teachers Union, and Chairman of the Committee Against Racism and for Co-existence in the Western Galilee. 

Faris died in Acre in April 2021 at the age of 85.

References

External links

1935 births
2021 deaths
Arab members of the Knesset
Arab people in Mandatory Palestine
Hashomer Hatzair members
Arab Israeli anti-racism activists
Israeli Muslims
Mapam politicians
Members of the 12th Knesset (1988–1992)
Meretz politicians
People from Acre, Israel
University of Haifa alumni